"Paradise" is a song by Italian production trio Meduza, featuring vocals from Irish singer-songwriter and musician Dermot Kennedy. It was released on 30 October 2020 by Island. The song was written by Conor Manning, Dan Caplen, Dermot Kennedy, Gez O'Connell, Joshua Grimmett, Luca De Gregorio, Mattia Vitale, Simone Giani and Wayne Hector.

Music video 
A music video for the song was directed by Jess Kohl and shot in Craco, a ghost town in the Italian region of Basilicata. Later another music video with Meduza and Kennedy performing live was released; the filming took place in Milan and New York.

Personnel
Credits adapted from Tidal.
 Luca De Gregorio – producer, composer, lyricist, additional keyboards, associated performer, drums, mastering engineer, mixer, programming, studio personnel
 Mattia Vitale – producer, composer, lyricist, additional keyboards, associated performer, drums, programming
 Simone Giani – producer, composer, lyricist, additional keyboards, associated performer, drums, programming
 Conor Manning – composer, lyricist
 Dan Caplen – composer, lyricist
 Dermot Kennedy – composer, lyricist, associated performer, featured artist, vocals
 Gez O'Connell – composer, lyricist
 Joshua Grimmett – composer, lyricist
 Wayne Hector – composer, lyricist
 Koz – studio personnel, vocal engineer

Charts

Weekly charts

Year-end charts

Certifications

Release history

References

2020 singles
2020 songs
Meduza (producers) songs
Dermot Kennedy songs
Irish Singles Chart number-one singles
Island Records singles
Songs written by Dan Caplen
Songs written by Wayne Hector
Songs written by Dermot Kennedy